The Christina School District is a Delaware public school district located primarily in the Newark area and a non-contiguous portion of Wilmington.   The district office is located in the Drew Educational Support Center in Wilmington, with Dan Shelton as the current superintendent.

The district includes Newark, Brookside, central portions of Wilmington, most of Glasgow, about half of Bear, half of North Star, and parts of Pike Creek and Pike Creek Valley.

History
The district was created on July 1, 1981, from the New Castle County School District after legislation passed in 1980 permitted the State Board of Education to divide the New Castle County School District into smaller districts.  At the time all students in grades 5 and 6 went to schools of those grade levels, all of them in the city of Wilmington, to satisfy a State of Delaware desegregation directive that came into place in 1978.

From 1984 to 1988 its student population increased by 2,000 and it was the largest school district in Delaware. From 1987 to 1988 the student population increased by 500. Due to the growth, in 1988 two elementary schools were under construction, with completion scheduled in 1989, and the district enacted a $29.6 million program to build two additional schools and expand four. The district aimed to build capacity in Wilmington as it anticipated more grade 5-6 students enrolling. Additionally, it had one active school and one school not yet open south of Baltimore Pike despite having 1,877 students in grades Kindergarten through 3rd grade.

Lillian M. Lowery served as Superintendent of the Christina School District from 2006 until her appointment as Secretary of the Delaware Department of Education in 2009, and was subsequently appointed as Superintendent of the Maryland State Department of Education in 2012.

Schools

High schools
 Christiana High School
 Glasgow High School (Glasgow address, not in the CDP)
 Newark High School (Newark)

Middle schools
 Gauger-Cobbs Middle School (Brookside)
 Kirk (George V.) Middle School (Brookside)
 Shue-Medill (Wilmer E.) Middle School
 In 1988 Wilmer E. Shue Middle School fed into NHS, but it was physically located within the CHS attendance boundary. It adopted uniforms in the 1990s; in 1997 suspensions declined by 11%, and in 1998 they declined by 13.

Elementary/middle schools
 The Bancroft School (Wilmington)
 The Bayard School (Wilmington)
 The original building opened in 1925. The current school opened in 1973.

Elementary schools
 Brader (Henry M.) Elementary School
Opened fall 1989
 Brookside Elementary School (Brookside)
 Downes (John R.) Elementary School (Newark)
 Gallaher (Robert S.) Elementary School (unincorporated area)
 Jones (Albert H.) Elementary School (unincorporated area)
 Keene (William B.) Elementary School (Glasgow)
 Leasure (May B.) Elementary School (Bear)
Opened as Eden School and taught 1-8 but later reduced to grades 1-6 when NHS began accepting grades 7–8. A 1934 fire gutted the school and classes were temporarily moved to Lodge Hall; the new facility opened in 1935. The school received its current name, which honors teacher Elizabeth May Brown Leasure, in 1970, and the current facility opened in 1998.
 Maclary (R. Elisabeth) Elementary School - Chapel Hill (Newark address) 
 Marshall (Thurgood) Elementary School (unincorporated area)
 McVey (Joseph M.) Elementary School (unincorporated area)
 In 1988 it was the only elementary school that had all of its attendance boundaries located in a single feeder for each subsequent level, so its students stayed together until grade 12.
 Oberle (William A.) Elementary School (Bear)
 The school, then Porter Road Elementary School, opened in 2009, and it changed to its current name in 2011. Its namesake was a member of the Delaware House of Representatives.
 Smith (Jennie E.) Elementary School (Brookside)
 West Park Place Elementary School (Newark)
 Wilson (Etta J.) Elementary School (Pike Creek Valley)

Early childhood education
 Christina Early Education Center
It adopted school uniforms in the 1990s. In 1998 52% of the students reported having a positive reception to wearing uniforms, 60.2% of parents argued that uniforms were less expensive than non-uniform clothes, and 65% of teachers stated that uniforms improved the classrooms.
Stubbs Early Education Center

Other schools/programs
 Brennen School - Delaware Autism Program
 Delaware School for the Deaf
 Douglass School
 Middle School Honors Academy at Christiana High School
 Montessori Academies at Christina
 Networks School for Employability Skills
 Christina R.E.A.C.H.
 Sarah Pyle Academy

Former schools
 Dr. Charles Richard Drew Elementary School (Wilmington) - It was on the east side of Wilmington. In 1988 the district proposed expansion. In the 1990s the school, as Drew-Pyle, adopted school uniforms. In 1998 76% of parents stated that it makes getting dressed for school easier and 65% stated that the cost is lower with uniforms. Above 50% of the students wanted to revert to a non-uniform policy. All of the teachers expressed support in keeping uniforms.
 Elbert-Palmer Elementary School (Wilmington) - It was in Southbridge, Wilmington. It closed in 1981, but in 1988 was under renovation and being expanded so it could reopen in fall 1989.
 Casimir Pulaski Elementary School (Wilmington) - It was in Hedgeville. In 1988 the district proposed expansion.
 Pyle Elementary School (Wilmington)
 Frederick Douglass Stubbs School (Wilmington) - It was in Canby Park. It was a center for handicapped students, but in 1988 they were being mainstreamed into traditional schools so Stubbs could be expanded and converted into a regular school.

Facilities 
Its current administrative offices are in the Drew Educational Support Center in Wilmington. It was formerly the Dr. Charles Richard Drew Elementary School.

It previously had its administrative headquarters in Newark. These administrative offices were formerly housed in the Old Newark Comprehensive School.

Dress code
By 1998 three schools: the early childhood center, Shue-Medill Middle School, and Drew-Pyle Elementary School had adopted school uniforms, prompting other districts to consider it, though in 1998 the number of public schools in Delaware with uniforms was below 20.

Controversy 
The District has been criticized for its strict interpretation of its "no weapons" policy. In 2009 it suspended a six-year-old Cub Scout for taking a camping utensil to school and wanted to send the child to its alternative placement school for 45 days as punishment. In 2007 the District expelled a seventh-grade girl for using a utility knife to cut windows out of a paper house for a class project. In 2011, a seventh-grader was suspended and almost expelled for dyeing her hair.

References

External links 

Christina School District Website

Education in Wilmington, Delaware
Newark, Delaware
1981 establishments in Delaware
School districts established in 1981
School districts in New Castle County, Delaware